Last Breath or The Last Breath may refer to:

Books
Last Breath, novel by Tunku Halim
Last Breath, Morganville Vampires novel by Rachel Caine 2011
The Last Breath, Paddy Meehan novel by Denise Mina  2012
"Last Breath" (short story), by Joe Hill 2014

Film
The Last Breath (1999 film), a Canadian drama film originally titled Le Dernier souffle
Epitaph (film) aka The Last Breath,  a 2007 South Korean film
Saansein: The Last Breath 2016 film starring Rajneesh Duggal
Last Breath (2019 film), a documentary

Music
"Last Breath" (Sevendust song)
"Last Breath" (Liamoo song), 2018
"Last Breath", song by Attack Attack! from Attack Attack! (album)
"Last Breath", song by Chelsea Grin from My Damnation
"Last Breath", song by Hatebreed from Satisfaction Is the Death of Desire, 1997
"Last Breath", a 2010 song by Plain White T's from Wonders of the Younger